In 2013, the Australian radio station ABC Classic FM held a Classic 100 Music in the Movies countdown.

The selection of works that was available in the survey was determined between 15 April and 26 April 2013 (with the public being able to add works to the list initiated by the station). Voting (by the public) for the finalised list of works was held between 3 May and 17 May 2013, and the countdown was broadcast from 7 to 10 June 2013.

Countdown results
The results of the countdown are as follows:

Programming
For more information about the works broadcast (including performers and recording details), see ABC Classic FM's programming notes:
 Numbers 100 to 52
 Numbers 51 to 38
 Numbers 37 to 1

See also
 Classic 100 Countdowns

References

External links
 
 The list of 101–200

Classic 100 Countdowns (ABC)
2013 in Australian music